Peter Hart is the name of:

Peter D. Hart, American pollster
Peter E. Hart (born c. 1940s), computer scientist and pioneer in artificial intelligence
Peter Hart (historian) (1963–2010), Canadian historian, specialising in modern Irish history
Peter Hart (media critic), media analyst at Fairness and Accuracy in Reporting
Peter Hart (footballer) (born 1957), English footballer
Peter Hart (military historian) (born 1955), British military historian

See also 
Hart (surname)